Galium sylvaticum, commonly known as Scotch mist or wood bedstraw, is a plant species of the genus  Rubiaceae. Its genus name, Galium, is derived from the Greek word for "milk," apparently because some species have been used to curdle milk.

It is native to central Europe: France, Italy, Germany, Poland, Hungary, the former Yugoslavia and smaller countries in between. It is also naturalized in scattered locations in North America (Maine, Vermont, Massachusetts, Connecticut, New York, Ontario, Michigan, Illinois, Wisconsin, Washington and Oregon). It is often found in anthropogenic (man-made or disturbed) habitats, forest edges, meadows and fields.

It is a perennial, branching herb with thin stems. Its leaves are in whorls of six, each narrowly linear. Flowers are in open terminal panicles, white and four-petaled.

References

External links
 
USDA Plants profile, Scotch mist, Galium sylvaticum 
Tela Botanica, Gaillet des bois
Wilde Planten in Nederland en België, Boswalstro, Scotchmist, Gaillet des forêts, Wald-Labkraut, Galium sylvaticum
Botanische Spaziergaenge,  Bilder von Österreichs Flora, Galium sylvaticum / (Eigentliches) Wald- Labkraut

sylvaticum
Flora of Europe
Flora of Italy
Flora of Germany
Flora of the Netherlands
Flora of Belgium
Flora of Poland
Flora of Austria
Flora of the Czech Republic
Flora of Slovakia
Flora of Switzerland
Flora of Hungary
Flora of Croatia
Flora of Serbia
Flora of Kosovo
Flora of Slovenia
Flora of Bosnia and Herzegovina
Plants described in 1762
Taxa named by Carl Linnaeus